William Howie, Baron Howie of Troon (2 March 1924 – 26 May 2018), known as Will Howie, was a British Labour Party politician and Member of Parliament (MP).

Howie was elected to the House of Commons at a 1963 by-election in the Luton constituency, following the appointment of Conservative MP Charles Hill as chairman of the Independent Television Authority. He was re-elected at the 1964 general election with a majority of only 723 votes.

He held his seat at the 1966 election with an increased majority of 2,464, but at the 1970 general election he lost his seat to the Conservative Charles Simeons.

On 21 April 1978, he was made a life peer as Baron Howie of Troon, of Troon in the District of Kyle and Carrick.

On 17 July 2007 it was revealed that Howie provided a parliamentary security pass to Doug Smith, Chairman of the lobbying group Westminster Advisers.

References

Sources
Guardian obituary
UK General Elections since 1832

External links 
 

1924 births
2018 deaths
Labour Party (UK) MPs for English constituencies
Howie of Troon
UK MPs 1959–1964
UK MPs 1964–1966
UK MPs 1966–1970
UK MPs who were granted peerages
Ministers in the Wilson governments, 1964–1970
Life peers created by Elizabeth II